Edward Burnett Lawson (September 26, 1895 – November 19, 1962) was a US Ambassador to Israel (1954–1959) and Iceland (1949–54). He was a World War I veteran.

Biography
Lawson was born on September 26, 1895, in Newport, Tennessee. He graduated from Georgetown University with a BS in foreign service (1924) and later MS (1925). He fought in World War I and later joined the US State Department.

Diplomatic career
After many posts such as Economic Counselor, Ankara, Turkey (1944–47), Commercial Attache, Managua, Nicaragua (1940–44), Commercial Attache, Prague, Czechoslovakia (1935–39), Trade Commissioner, Johannesburg, South Africa (1927–35), and Bureau of Foreign and Domestic Commerce (1926–27), he served as ambassador to Iceland (1949–54) and the newly formed state of Israel. He was Deputy Assistant Secretary for Personnel in 1959–60.

He was married to Jean McDonald Lawson and died of heart failure on November 19, 1962.

References

External links

Ambassadors of the United States to Israel
Ambassadors of the United States to Iceland
1895 births
1962 deaths
Walsh School of Foreign Service alumni
People from Newport, Tennessee
United States Foreign Service personnel